Steven Arthur Farber is an American scientist. He is a staff scientist at Carnegie Institution for Science.

Education 
Steven Arthur Farber completed a bachelor of science in engineering with a major in electrical and biomedical engineering from Rutgers University in 1986. He earned a master of science in technology and policy in 1991 and a doctor of philosophy in neurology in 1993 at Massachusetts Institute of Technology. His dissertation was titled Neuronal activity and membrane turnover in rat brain. His thesis supervisor was Richard Wurtman. Farber was a Carnegie Fellow in Marnie Halpern's laboratory.

Career 
Farber was an assistant professor at Thomas Jefferson University. In 2004, he became a staff researcher at the Carnegie Institution for Science. He works in the department of embryology. In 2018, he was awarded a 5-year $3.3 million NIH grant for researching novel pharmaceuticals and diseases associated with altered levels of lipoproteins.

Together with Jamie Shuda he developed an outreach program named BioEYES  which allowed students to gain hands-on biology experience by studying live zebrafish in the classroom.

Honors and awards
 2018 Elizabeth W. Jones Award for Excellence in Education from the Genetics Society of America

References

External links 

 

Living people
Year of birth missing (living people)
20th-century American scientists
21st-century American scientists
Thomas Jefferson University faculty
Rutgers University alumni
Massachusetts Institute of Technology School of Science alumni